Syrgenstein is a municipality  in the district of Dillingen in Bavaria in Germany.

References

Dillingen (district)